Superlink may refer to:

 Superlink (railway network)
 Transformer: Superlink, see Transformers: Energon
 M&M Superlink, see Mutants & Masterminds